This is a list of aviation-related events from 1930:

Events 
 The Surrey Aero Club inaugurates recreational flights from Gatwick Race Course (now London Gatwick Airport).
 The German airship LZ 127 Graf Zeppelin makes its first crossing of the South Atlantic.
 The Aeromarine-Klemm Corporation, formerly the Aeromarine Plane and Motor Company, goes out of business, although the Uppercu-Burnelli Corporation takes over production of Aeromarine aircraft engines.
 Nineteen-year-old Rex Finney of Los Angeles, California, uses the first successful wingsuit, employing it to increase horizontal movement and maneuverability during a parachute jump.
 During the year, the percentage of United States Navy enlisted personnel with an aviation-related rating rises to 9 percent.
 Autumn 1930 – The Royal Air Force rededicates No. 443 Flight of the Fleet Air Arm as the first British catapult flight of aircraft assigned to operate from battleship and cruiser catapults.

January
 January 2 – Leroy Grumman, Leon Swirbul, and William Schwender found the Grumman Aircraft Engineering Corporation at Baldwin on Long Island, New York.
 January 16 – On speed trials, the British airship R100 reaches , making her the fastest airship in the world.
 January 17 – Record-setting aviator Frank Hawks attempts to take off in the Lockheed Air Express Texaco Five (registration NR7955) from a soggy field in West Palm Beach, Florida, but the plane is destroyed in a spectacular crash into a row of three parked aircraft. Hawks is unharmed.
 January 19 – Trying to return to Tijuana, Mexico, after taking off in poor weather for a scheduled passenger flight to Los Angeles, California, Maddux Airlines Flight 7 – the Ford 5-AT-C Tri-Motor NC9689 – crashes in Oceanside, California, and catches fire, killing all 16 people on board. It is the deadliest aviation accident in American history at the time.
 January 25 – American Airways is formed.

February
 At the Philadelphia Navy Yard in Philadelphia, Pennsylvania, the United States Navy tests a Ford 5-AT-74 Trimotor equipped with 30-foot (9.1-meter) floats during the month for use as a torpedo bomber, but does not pursue the concept further. 
 February 10 – The Air Union Farman F.63bis Goliath F-FHMY suffers a tailplane structural failure during a flight from Paris-Le Bourget Airport outside Paris to Croydon Airport in London with six people on board. The pilot tries to land at the Pagehurst Emergency Landing Ground in Marden, Kent, England, but the plane stalls and crashes at Marden. Two passengers die, and the other two passengers and both crew members suffer injuries.
 February 15 – The Italian air power theorist Giulio Douhet dies at the age of 60.
 February 17 – A fire destroys the workshops of the Société d'Aviation Letord at Meudon, France, as well as aircraft, including the first Couzinet 20 and the Couzinet 27 Arc-en-ciel II.
 February 24 – Rancho-Boyeros Airport – the future José Martí International Airport – opens at Havana, Cuba.

March
 The Government of Chile creates the Directorate General of Civil Aviation as Chile′s national civil aviation authority.
 March 21 – The Chilean army and navy air arms are combined to form the Chilean Air Force.
 March 28 – The Imperial Ethiopian Air Force flies its first mission, when three of its biplanes drop propaganda leaflets over the army of the rebel Gugsa Welle as it advances across Ethiopia's Begemder province. The leaflets prompt some members of his army to desert.
 March 30 – Towed by a Waco ASO biplane, the glider Texaco Eaglet, piloted by Frank Hawks, takes off from San Diego, California, to make a multi-day flight across the continental United States to New York City.
 March 31 – The three Imperial Ethiopian Air Force biplanes reappear over Gugsa Welle's army and bomb it at the beginning of the Battle of Anchem in the first combat mission in the air force's history. The bombing proves decisive, as it prompts so many members of Gugsa Welle's army to desert that it is badly outnumbered by the time ground combat begins between it and Imperial forces at Debre Zebit, when many more of its members desert, resulting in its defeat and Gugsa Welle's death.

April
 A float-equipped Cierva C.12 autogiro – dubbed the "Hydrogiro" – takes off from Southampton Water off the south coast of England. It is the first time that a rotary-wing aircraft takes off from a body of water.
 April 1 – Gerhard Fieseler founds the Fieseler aircraft manufacturing company under the name Fieseler Flugzeugbau Kassel.
 April 2
The first Korean aviator, An Chang-nam, dies in the crash of his aircraft while he is returning to the airport at the Shanxi Aviation Academy at Taiyuan, Shanxi, China, in bad weather.
The prototype of the Latécoère 340 trimotor parasol-winged flying boat (registration F-AKDI) breaks up in the air and crashes while being demonstrated for a French Navy official, killing both men on board. No further examples of the aircraft are built.
 April 6
 Towed by a Waco ASO biplane, the glider Texaco Eaglet, piloted by Frank Hawks, arrives at New York City after an eight-day journey from San Diego, California, during which it has spent 44 hours 10 minutes in the air. The flight demonstrates the feasibility of towing gliders over long distances.
 April 9 – Flying his de Havilland DH.60 Moth Miss India, Man Mohan Singh becomes the first Indian to fly (solo) from England to British India, landing at RAF Drigh Road, Karachi one month and one day after departing from Croydon Airport.
 April 23 – A diesel engineed aircraft crashes in New York (state); among the 3 killed is Lionel Woolson, designer of the radial air-cooled aero diesel engine.
 April 27 – During an air show at Fayetteville, Tennessee, pilot Milton P. Covert's plane loses altitude and crashes on a railroad embankment while approaching the landing area, striking spectators standing on the embankment. Covert survives, but at least nine spectators are killed and about 20 injured.

May
 May 5–14 – Amy Johnson makes the first solo flight from England to Australia by a woman, flying from Croydon to Darwin in a de Havilland Gipsy Moth.    
 May 12–13 – Flying for Aéropostale, the French pilot Jean Mermoz makes the first nonstop commercial flight across the South Atlantic Ocean, flying from Dakar, Senegal, to Natal, Brazil, in the float-equipped Latécoère 28-3 mail plane Comte de la Vaulx. The  flight takes 19 hours 35 minutes, and the plane carries  of mail. On the return flight, Mermoz is forced to ditch Comte de la Vaux at sea; although he, his two companions, and the mail are saved, the aircraft sinks and is lost.
 May 15 – Ellen Church becomes the world's first female flight attendant, working for Boeing Air Transport.
 May 18 – The German dirigible Graf Zeppelin leaves Friederichshafen, Germany, on the first airship flight across the South Atlantic, bound for Rio de Janeiro, Brazil. It is a trial flight to test the feasibility of regular airship service between Germany and Brazil.
 May 23 – President Herbert Hoover presents the crew of the flying boat NC-4 with gold medals for completing the first transatlantic flight in 1919.
 May 27 – A CLASSA Ford 4-AT trimotor makes the first flight between Peninsular Spain and the Canary Islands, landing at Los Rodeos Airport on Tenerife Island.

June
One of the passengers is killed and the aircraft is damaged beyond repair, but the other 12 passengers and both crew members survive.
 June 13 – Making his 92nd crossing of the Andes carrying mail between Argentina and Chile for Aéropostale, French aviator Henri Guillaumet crashes his Potez 25 in bad weather at Laguna del Diamante near Mendoza, Argentina. He walks through three mountain passes before reaching a village and safety on June 19.

July
 July 12 – Flying a Waco JYM biplane to Chicago, Illinois, Northwest Airways pilot Mal Freeburg sees that the Chicago, Burlington & Quincy Railroad trestle near Trevino, Wisconsin, is on fire shortly after he flies over a Burlington Blackhawk express passenger train headed for the trestle. He flies at low level back up the tracks and makes three low passes to warn the train, flashing his landing lights and dropping landing flares. The train stops only  short of the burning trestle.
 July 16-August 8 – The second International Tourist Aircraft Contest Challenge 1930 in Berlin, won by the German crew of Fritz Morzik on the BFW M.23 plane.
 July 19 – Record-holding aviator Frank Goldsborough dies in a crash in Vermont on his 20th birthday.
 July 20-August 1 – A  race over Europe takes place as part of the Challenge 1930 contest.
 July 23 – Aviation pioneer Glenn Curtiss dies, aged 52.
 July 29 – The British airship R100 sets out on a test flight from the United Kingdom to Montreal, Quebec, Canada, and back. She will arrive at Montreal 78 hours later, remain there for 12 days, then begin the return trip to the United Kingdom on August 13, arriving in London on August 16 after a flight of 57½ hours.

August
 August 3 - The Imperial Japanese Navy practices dive bombing for the first time, using fighters to sink the retired protected cruiser Akashi  with  practice bombs in Tokyo Bay.
 August 8 - End of the Challenge 1930 contest, won by  Fritz Morzik.
 August 13 – Flying the Travel Air Type R Mystery Ship Texaco 13, Frank Hawks sets a new west-to-east transcontinental airspeed record for a flight across the continental United States, completing the flight in 12 hours 25 minutes 3 seconds. At the time, it is the fastest crossing of the United States ever made.
 August 22 – Attempting to avoid a thunderstorm in poor weather on a domestic passenger flight in Czechoslovakia from Kbely Airport in Bratislava to Brno, the Czechoslovak State Airlines Ford 5-AT-C Tri-Motor OK-FOR banks sharply to avoid a 35-meter-tall (115-foot-tall) smokestack, strikes the ground, and crashes at Jihlava, killing 12 of the 13 people aboard.
 August 23 - The Ford National Reliability Air Tour starts in Chicago.
 August 25 - Eddie August Schneider sets the junior transcontinental air speed record. He flies from Westfield, New Jersey.

September
 September 1–2 – Flying the Breguet 19 Super Bidon "?" from Paris to New York City, French aviators Dieudonné Costes and Maurice Bellonte make the first nonstop westbound heavier-than-air flight across the North Atlantic Ocean between the European and North American mainlands, covering either , according to different sources, in 37 hours 18 minutes.
 September 3 – The Ford National Reliability Air Tour finishes in Chicago. Harry Russell takes first place, and Eddie August Schneider finishes in eight place, but wins the Great Lakes Trophy.

October
 October 1 – Western Air Express and Transcontinental Air Transport merge to form Transcontinental and Western Air, Inc., which in 1950 will be renamed Trans World Airlines.
 October 5 – The British dirigible R101, at the time the world's largest airship, crashes in France while on a flight from Cardington, Bedfordshire, England, to Karachi in British India. Forty-eight of the 54 people on board are killed, including Royal Air Force Air Vice Marshal Sir Sefton Brancker; the Irish aviator and athlete Herbert Carmichael Irwin, who was the captain of R101; the noted British airship pilot and engineer George Herbert Scott; and British Secretary of State for Air Christopher Thomson, 1st Baron Thomson.
 October 7 – Upon the completion of the final game of the 1930 World Series in Philadelphia, Pennsylvania, Frank Hawks flies photographs of the game to North Beach Airport in Queens, New York, in the Travel Air Type R Mystery Ship Texaco 13, delivering them only 20 minutes after the end of the game and faster than wire services, demonstrating that fast air courier services are feasible.
 October 9–10 – First flight by a Canadian, pilot Capt. J. Erroll Boyd (1891-1960), from North America (Harbour Grace, NL) to England, in the Wright-Bellanca WB-2 Maple Leaf (aka, Columbia), navigated by the American, Lieut. Harry Connor. This flight was also notable for transporting mail bearing a surcharged stamp as a commemorative overprint.
 October 25 – Transcontinental and Western Air begins the first all-air coast-to-coast passenger service in the United States with regular passenger flights between New York, New York, and Los Angeles, California. The trip takes 30 hours and includes an overnight stop in Kansas City, Missouri.
 October 30 – The Imperial Airways Handley Page W.8g Hamilton City of Washington (registration G-EBIX) crashes into high ground in dense fog at Boulogne, France, during a scheduled flight from Paris-Le Bourget Airport outside Paris to Croydon Airport in London. Three of the six people on board die.

November
 November 3 – Brothers Thomas Elmer Braniff and Paul Revere Braniff found their second airline, Braniff Airways, Inc. It eventually will become Braniff International Airways.
 November 13 – Braniff Airways begins operations, using Lockheed Vega aircraft to offer service between Oklahoma City, Oklahoma; Tulsa, Oklahoma; and Wichita Falls, Texas.
 November 21 – The Dornier Do R4 Superwal flying boat airliner I-RONY, operating on a passenger flight for the Italian airline Società Anonima Navigazione Aerea (SANA), disappears over the Mediterranean Sea during a flight from Barcelona, Spain, to Marseilles, France, with the loss of all six people on board.
 November 24 – The Ford Motor Company Ford 5-AT-C Trimotor NX419H crashes on landing at Ford Airport in Dearborn, Michigan, killing both people on board.

December
 December 3 – A commercial airline flight arrives in Jamaica for the first time when a Pan American Airways Consolidated Commodore flying boat lands in the harbor at Kingston.
 December 17 – The Junkers W 34 Bolivar makes the first international flight from Venezuela to Colombia to commemorate the centennial of the death of Simón Bolívar.

First flights 
 Aichi AB-2
 Arado Ar 64
 Avro 626
 Bellanca Aircruiser
 Bellanca CH-400 Skyrocket
 Farman F.141
 Focke-Wulf A 32
 Focke-Wulf A 33
 Kawasaki Type 92
 Nakajima E4N
 Nakajima Ki-6
 Northrop Alpha
 Pitcairn PA-8
 Polikarpov TB-2
 Potez 38
 Saro Cloud
 Texaco Eaglet, prototype of the Franklin PS-2
 Yokosuka K4Y
 Spring 1930 – RWD-4

January
 Potez 39
 January 13 – Farman F.300
 January 30 – Boeing Model 202, later redesignated Boeing XP-15

February
 Boeing Model 205, later redesignated Boeing XF5B-1
 Latécoère 340  F-AKDI

March
 Dornier Do Y
 March 30 – Polikarpov I-6

April
 RWD-3
 April 29 - Polikarpov I-5

May
 Mitsubishi K3M (Allied reporting name "Pine")
 Berliner-Joyce XFJ-1
 Cessna CR-2
 Curtiss XP-10
 May 6 – Boeing Monomail
 May 16 – Blériot 110
 May 28 – Blackburn Segrave

June
 Curtiss XP-17 Hawk
 June 12 – Handley Page H.P. 38, prototype of the Handley Page Heyford
 June 28 – Avro 621, prototype of the Avro Tutor and Avro Sea Tutor

July
 Saunders A.7 Severn 
 July 18 - Blackburn Sydney

August
 August 24 – Latécoère 380

September
 September 1 - Berliner-Joyce P-16
 September 12 - Taylor E-2
 September 24 - Short Rangoon

October
 PZL P.7
 October 5 – Junkers Ju 52
 October 10 – Short S.15 K.F.1, prototype of the Kawanishi H3K
 October 13 – Junkers Ju 52/1m
 October 16 – Saro A.21 Windhover ZK-ABW
 October 22 – Fairchild 100

November
 First week of November – Couzinet 20
 November 14 – Handley Page HP.42
 November 18 – Boeing Model 96, later redesignated Boeing XP-9
 November 25 – Fairey Hendon
 November 27 – Bernard 80 GR

December
 Curtiss XP-21
 Westland C.O.W. Gun Fighter
 December 22 - Tupolev ANT-6

Entered service 
 Polikarpov R-5 with the Soviet Air Force
 Saro A17 Cutty Sark

January
 January 1 – Avro 618 Ten with Australian National Airways

May
 May 1 – Curtiss F8C Helldiver, the first United States Navy dive bomber designed as such, with Fighter Squadron 1 (VF-1B) aboard

July
 Levasseur PL.7 with French Naval Aviation aboard the aircraft carrier Béarn

November
 November 9 – Ford RR-4, a version of the Ford Trimotor, with the U.S. Navy.

Retirements 

 Curtiss P-1 Hawk by the United States Army Air Corps

May
 Curtiss TS-1 by the United States Navy

References

 
Aviation by year